Stephen Rea (born 31 October 1946) is an Irish film and stage actor. Rea has appeared in films such as V for Vendetta, Michael Collins, Interview with the Vampire and Breakfast on Pluto. Rea was nominated for the Academy Award for Best Actor for Neil Jordan's thriller The Crying Game (1992). He has had important roles in the Hugo Blick TV series The Shadow Line and The Honourable Woman, for which he won a BAFTA Award. In 2020, The Irish Times ranked Rea the 13th greatest Irish film actor of all time.

Early life 
Rea was born in Belfast; his father was a bus driver and his mother a housewife. He studied English at the Queen's University Belfast and drama at the Abbey Theatre School in Dublin.

In the late 1970s, he acted in the Focus Company in Dublin with Gabriel Byrne and Colm Meaney.

Career 
After appearing on the stage and in television and film for many years in Ireland and England, Rea came to international attention when he was nominated for the Academy Award for Best Actor for the film The Crying Game. He is a frequent collaborator with Irish film-maker Neil Jordan. Rea has long been associated with some of the most important writers in Ireland. His association with playwright Stewart Parker, for example, began when they were students together at the Queen's University Belfast.

Rea helped establish the Field Day Theatre Company in 1980 with Tom Paulin, Brian Friel, Seamus Heaney and Seamus Deane. In recognition for his contribution to theatre and performing arts, Rea was given honorary degrees from both the Queen's University Belfast and the Ulster University in 2004.

Rea's friendship with American playwright and actor Sam Shepard dates back to the early 1970s, and he starred in Shepard's directorial début of his play Geography of a Horse Dreamer at the Royal Court Theatre in 1974. In 2007, Rea began a successful and acclaimed relationship with both the Abbey Theatre and Sam Shepard, appearing in Kicking a Dead Horse (2007) and Ages of the Moon (2009), both penned by Shepard and also both transferred to New York. Rea returned to the Abbey in 2009 to appear in the world première of Sebastian Barry's Tales of Ballycumber.

Rea was hired to speak the words of Gerry Adams when Sinn Féin was under a 1988–94 broadcasting ban.

In 2011, Rea featured in the BBC crime drama The Shadow Line, playing antagonist Gatehouse.

In April 2012, Rea read James Joyce's short story "The Dead" on RTÉ Radio 1. He also narrated for the BBC Radio 4 production of Ulysses for Bloomsday, 16 June 2012.

Rea starred in Enda Walsh's 2014 play Ballyturk and portrayed Jordan in Out of the Dark, in which he co-stars alongside Julia Stiles, Scott Speedman and Alejandro Furth.

Personal life 
Rea was married for 17 years to Dolours Price, a former Provisional Irish Republican Army bomber and hunger striker who later became a critic of Sinn Féin. (Another news source suggests a marriage of 20 years, from 1983 to 2003.) Price attended a performance of Rea's at the Court Theatre in London in 1973, the night before she participated in a car bombing which injured 200 people. They had been divorced when she died on 23 January 2013. They have two sons.

Rea is an Ambassador for UNICEF Ireland. He lives in County Donegal.

Filmography

Film

Television

Stage

References

External links 

 
 
 
 Stage credits

1946 births
Living people
Alumni of Queen's University Belfast
Male film actors from Northern Ireland
Male stage actors from Northern Ireland
Male television actors from Northern Ireland
Male actors from Belfast
People educated at Belfast High School
21st-century male actors from Northern Ireland
20th-century male actors from Northern Ireland
Best Supporting Actor BAFTA Award (television) winners